HMS Wolverine (or Wolverene) was a Royal Navy 18-gun , launched in 1805 at Topsham, near Exeter. Early in her career she was involved in two fratricidal incidents, one involving a British frigate and then a newsworthy case in which she helped capture a British slave ship. She later captured a small naval vessel and several privateers, and took part in the invasion of Martinique, and during the War of 1812, in the attack on Baltimore. Wolverine was decommissioned in August or September 1815 and was sold on 15 February 1816.

Service
Wolverine entered service in 1805 under Commander John Smith (or Smyth). In November Wolverine and the frigate  encountered each other off the coast of Madeira. After a series of ambiguous and misinterpreted moves by the other, the two captains mistook each other for enemies and opened fire. Both vessels survived and the two captains proceeded to exchange mutually recriminatory letters.

Commander Francis Augustus Collier replaced Smith on 15 January 1806. Wolverine then deployed to the Caribbean.

On 12 March Wolverine, after a chase of 15 hours, captured the French Navy schooner Tremeuse (or Trimeuse, or Tremieuse), which was armed with two 9-pounder carronades and one long 6-pounder; she had a crew of 53 men and was from Guadeloupe. She had been out 12 days without capturing anything.

On 16 October Wolverine captured the packet Guadeloupe, of one gun and 42 men. On 25 October she recaptured the American vessel Franklin, which was carrying masts to Barbados and had been a prize to Guadeloupe.

Next, on 9 November, with Wolverine in company, captured the 8-gun Jeune Gabrielle. She had thrown half her guns overboard during the chase. She was under the command of M. Auguste Boufford and had a crew of 75. She was out of Guadeloupe and had not made any captures. The next day Wolverine captured Marianne, of one gun and 46 men.

On 30 November 1806 there occurred a second unfortunate incident when Wolverine fired on a British merchant vessel engaged in lawful trade. At 10pm, Dart, under Commander Joseph Spear, and Wolverine came upon a ship that they suspected was a French privateer and that kept up a running fight until morning, only surrendering after her captain and several of her crew had been wounded, of whom six later died. The vessel turned out to be the British 24-gun slaver , out of Liverpool, under Captain Hugh Crow (or Crowe). He had thought that the two vessels chasing him in the dark were French privateers out of Cayenne and was determined not to surrender his vessel without a fight. Commander Spear gave him a letter of praise for his determined resistance and the fight became something of a sensation; on his return home Crow received honour, glory, and a substantial reward for his gallantry. Also, "many of the wretched negroes were killed or injured."

On 27 January 1807 Wolverine was in sight when  captured the French sloop Favorite. Jason had been detached, together with the brig Wolverine, to the coast of Surinam to search for Favorite, which she discovered in January and captured in a short engagement. Favorite had been a Royal Navy sloop that the French had captured in January 1806; the Royal Navy took her back into service as Goree.

Four days later, Wolverine chased and captured the French privateer Petite Confiance, which had been cruising from Guadeloupe for the previous month. During the chase she had thrown two of her three guns overboard. She had a crew of 50 and had been out of Guadeloupe for a month without taking any prizes.

On 22 April 1808, the sloop Goree, under Commander Joseph Spear, engaged the French brigs Palinure and Pilade in an inconclusive action. The schooner Superieur came to Gorees assistance, followed a little while later by the frigate  and Wolverine, which arrived too late to engage. On 31 October Circe captured Palinure.

Command briefly passed to Commander John Simpson in 1809, who commanded Wolverine during the invasion of Martinique in January and February 1809. That same day Wolverine captured Napoleon.

Simpson transferred to Goree and command of Wolverine passed to Commander Joseph Spear. On the morning of 12 April Spear arrived at the Admiralty office with Rear-Admiral Alexander Cochrane's dispatches announcing the surrender of Martinique. In 1847 the Admiralty authorized the issuance of the Naval General Service Medal with clasp "Martinique" to all still surviving participants in the campaign.

On 27 September 1810 Wolverine had been in pursuit of a French brig when  joined the chase and after two and a half hours captured the quarry off the Lizard. The French vessel was the privateer San Joseph, of Saint Malo, under the command of a Joseph Wittevronghel, a Dane. San Joseph was one year old, about 100 tons (bm), and armed with 14 guns though she was pierced for 16. She had only been out one day when the British captured her and had taken nothing. Also,  had been in company with Wolverine.

Lloyd's List reported on 17 May 1811 that Wolverine had left Gibraltar on 29 April as escort to a convoy of some 16 vessels, including the store ship .

A court martial tried a seaman from Wolverine on 7 October 1811. The charge was that the seaman had absented himself without leave and had taken one of the ship's boats to do so. He received a sentence of 300 lashes.

On 17 November, Wolverine recaptured the sloop Minerva.

Wolverine was in sight on 15 February 1812 when the hired armed lugger Sandwich recaptured North Star.

On 7 November 1813, Wolverine captured the 6-gun Lugger no. 961, off Barfleur. No. 961 belonged to the Cherbourg flotilla. She was armed with six guns, had a crew of 32 men and was under the command of Lieutenant Berard. On 13 December Wolverine intercepted King of Rome, an American letter of marque, laden with colonial produce.

On 26 April 1814, Wolverine sailed with a convoy for Newfoundland, Nova Scotia, Quebec and New Brunswick. On 4 September Kerr became acting captain of Tonnant, the flagship of Sir Alexander Cochrane, on the coast of North America. Between 12 and 15 September, Wolverine participated in the unsuccessful British attack on Baltimore. On 5 October George Guy Burton was promoted to Commander and removed from Tonnant to Wolverine,

Fate
Burton sailed Wolverne home. Wolverine was paid off either on 27 August 1815, or 8 September 1815, and then put in ordinary at Deptford. The Admiralty listed her for sale on 29 January 1816, and then sold her on 15 February for £810.

Notes

Citations

References
 
 

 Norie, J. W. (1842) The naval gazetteer, biographer and chronologist; containing a history of the late wars from 1793 to 1801; and from 1803 to 1815, and continued, as to the biographical part to the present time. (London, C. Wilson).
 
 Willis, Sam (2008) Fighting at Sea in the Eighteenth Century. (Woodbridge:Boydell Press).

External links
Michael Phillip's Ships of the Old Navy - Wolverine (1805)

Cruizer-class brig-sloops
Ships built on the River Exe
1805 ships
Friendly fire incidents